Bembecia volgensis is a moth of the family Sesiidae. It is found in the Upper Volga region of Russia.

References

Moths described in 1994
Sesiidae
Moths of Europe